Karl Erik Helmer Edlund (17 September 1900 – 29 August 1977) was a Swedish footballer who played as a forward for Sleipner. He featured three times for the Sweden national team between 1920 and 1922, scoring three goals.

Career statistics

International

Scores and results list Sweden's goal tally first, score column indicates score after each Edlund goal.

References

1900 births
1977 deaths
Sportspeople from Norrköping
Swedish footballers
Sweden international footballers
Association football forwards
IK Sleipner players
Footballers from Östergötland County